Boron monofluoride or fluoroborylene is a chemical compound with formula BF, one atom of boron and one of fluorine. It was discovered as an unstable gas and only in 2009 found to be a stable ligand combining with transition metals, in the same way as carbon monoxide. It is a subhalide, containing fewer than the normal number of fluorine atoms, compared with boron trifluoride. It can also be called a borylene, as it contains boron with two unshared electrons. BF is isoelectronic with carbon monoxide and dinitrogen; each molecule has 14 electrons.

Structure
The experimental B–F bond length is 1.26267 Å. Despite being isoelectronic to the triple-bonded species CO and N2, computational studies generally agree that the true bond order is much lower than 3. One reported computed bond order for the molecule is 1.4, compared with 2.6 for CO and 3.0 for N2.

BF is unusual in that the dipole moment is inverted with fluorine having a positive charge even though it is the more electronegative element. This is explained by the 2sp orbitals of boron being reoriented and having a higher electron density. Backbonding, or the transfer of π orbital electrons for the fluorine atom, is not required to explain the polarization.

Preparation
Boron monofluoride can be prepared by passing boron trifluoride gas at 2000 °C over a boron rod. It can be condensed at liquid nitrogen temperatures (−196 °C).

Properties
Boron monofluoride molecules have a dissociation energy of 7.8 eV or heat of formation −27.5±3 kcal/mole 760 kJ/mol. The first ionization potential is 11.115 eV. ωe is 1765 cm−1.

Reactions
BF can react with itself to form polymers of boron containing fluorine with between 10 and 14 boron atoms. BF reacts with BF3 to form B2F4. BF and B2F4 further combine to form B3F5. B3F5 is unstable above −50 °C and forms B8F12. This substance is a yellow oil.

BF reacts with acetylenes to make the 1,4-diboracyclohexadiene ring system. BF can condense with 2-butyne forming 1,4-difluoro-2,3,5,6-tetramethyl-1,4-diboracyclohexadiene. Also, it reacts with acetylene to make 1,4-difluoro-1,4-diboracyclohexadiene. Propene reacts to make a mix of cyclic and non-cyclic molecules which may contain BF or BF2.

BF hardly reacts with C2F4 or SiF4. BF does react with arsine, carbon monoxide, phosphorus trifluoride, phosphine, and phosphorus trichloride to make adducts like (BF2)3B•AsH3, (BF2)3B•CO, (BF2)3B•PF3, (BF2)3B•PH3, and (BF2)3B•PCl3.

BF reacts with oxygen: BF + O2 → OBF + O; with chlorine: BF + Cl2 → ClBF + Cl; and with nitrogen dioxide BF + NO2 → OBF + NO.

Ligand
A naïve analysis would suggest that BF is isoelectronic with carbon monoxide (CO) and so could form similar compounds to metal carbonyls. As discussed above (see ), BF has a much lower bond order, so that the valence shell around boron is unfilled.  Consequently, BF as a ligand is much more Lewis acidic; it tends to form higher-order bonds to metal centers, and can also bridge between two or three metal atoms (μ2 and μ3).  

Working with BF as a ligand is difficult due to its instability in the free state.  Instead, most routes tend to use derivatives of BF3 that decompose once coordinated.  

In a 1968 conference report, Kämpfer et al claimed to produce Fe(BF)(CO)4 via reaction of B2F4 with Fe(CO)5, but modern chemists have not reproduced the synthesis, and the original compound has no crystallographic characterization.  The first modern demonstration of BF coordinated to a transition element is due to Vidovic and Aldrige, who produced  (with BF bridging both ruthenium atoms) in 2009.  To make the compound, Vidovic and Aldridge reacted NaRu(CO)2(C5H5) with (Et2O)·BF3; the boron monofluoride ligand then formed in-place. 

Vidovic and Aldridge also developed a substance with the formula (PF3)4FeBF by reacting iron vapour with B2F4 and PF3.  Hafnium, thorium, titanium, and zirconium can form a difluoride with a BF ligand at the low temperature of 6K. These come about by reacting the atomic metal with BF3. 

The first fully characterized molecule featuring BF as a terminal ligand was synthesized by Drance and Figueroa in 2019, by sterically hindering the formation of a dimer.  In the molecule, boron is double-bonded to iron.

References

Boron compounds
Boron halides
Fluorides
Ligands